The microscopic scale is the scale of objects and events smaller than those that can easily be seen by the naked eye, requiring a lens or microscope to see them clearly. In physics, the microscopic scale is sometimes regarded as the scale between the macroscopic scale and the quantum scale. Microscopic units and measurements are used to classify and describe very small objects.  One common microscopic length scale unit is the micrometre (also called a micron) (symbol: μm), which is one millionth of a metre.

History 
Whilst compound microscopes were first developed in the 1590s, the significance of the microscopic scale was only truly established in the 1600s when Marcello Malphigi and Antonie van Leeuwenhoek microscopically observed frog lungs and microorganisms. As microbiology was established, the significance of making scientific observations at a microscopic level increased.

Published in 1665, Robert Hooke’s book Micrographia details his microscopic observations including fossils insects, sponges, and plants, which was possible through his development of the compound microscope. During his studies of cork, he discovered plant cells and coined the term ‘cell’.

Prior to the use of the micro- prefix, other terms were originally incorporated into the International metric system in 1795, such as centi- which represented a factor of 10^-2, and milli-, which represented a factor of 10^-3.

Over time the importance of measurements made at the microscopic scale grew, and an instrument named the Millionometre was developed by watch-making company owner Antoine LeCoultre in 1844. This instrument had the ability to precisely measure objects to the nearest micrometre.

The British Association for the Advancement of Science committee incorporated the micro- prefix into the newly established CGS system in 1873.

The micro- prefix was finally added to the official SI system in 1960, acknowledging measurements that were made at an even smaller level, denoting a factor of 10^-6.

Biology
By convention, the microscopic scale also includes classes of objects that are most commonly too small to see but of which some members are large enough to be observed with the eye. Such groups include the Cladocera, planktonic green algae of which Volvox is readily observable, and the protozoa of which stentor can be easily seen without aid.
The submicroscopic scale similarly includes objects that are too small to see with an optical microscope.

Thermodynamics
In thermodynamics and statistical mechanics, the microscopic scale is the scale at which we do not measure or directly observe the precise state of a thermodynamic system – such detailed states of a system are called microstates.  We instead measure thermodynamic variables at a macroscopic scale, i.e. the macrostate.

Levels of Microscopic Scale 

As the microscopic scale is covers any object that cannot be seen by the naked eye, yet is visible under a microscope, the range of objects that fall under this scale can be as small as an atom, visible underneath a transmission electron microscope. Microscope types are often distinguished by their mechanism and application, and can be divided into two general categories.

Light microscopes 
Amongst light microscopes, the utilised objective lens dictates how small of an object can be seen. These varying objective lenses can change the resolving power of the microscope, which determines the shortest distance that somebody is able to distinguish two separate objects through that microscope lens. It is important to note that the resolution between two objects varies from individual to individual, but the strength of the objective lenses can be quantified.

The most basic microscope used by Antonie van Leeuwenhoek in the 1660s, the Simple microscope, uses a singular lens. The user is therefore limited to the magnification allowed by the objective lens. As such, it is usually used to view non-complex items such as maps.

Compound light microscopes have a number of variations, including Bright-Field, Dark-Field, Phase-contrast and Fluorescent microscope. Each type functions to serve different purposes, but are all able to have a range of objective lenses, between 4x and 1000x magnification. Due to their mechanisms, they also have an improved resolving power and contrast in comparison to simple microscopes, and can be used to view the structure, shape and motility of a cell and its organisms, which can be as small as 0.1 micrometres.

Electron microscopes 
While electron microscopes are still a form of compound microscope, their use of electron beams to illuminate objects varies in mechanism significantly from compound light microscopes, allowing them to have a much higher resolving power, and magnification approximately 10,000 times more than light microscopes. These can be used to view objects such as atoms, which are as small as 0.001 micrometres.

Uses

Forensics 
During forensic investigations, trace evidence from crime scenes such as blood, fingerprints and fibres can be closely examined under microscopes, even to the extent of determining the age of a trace. Along with other specimens, biological traces can be used to accurately identify individuals present at a location, down to cells found in their blood.

Gemology 
When the monetary value of gems is determined, various professions in gemology require systematic observation of the microscopic physical and optical properties of gemstones. This can involve the use of stereo microscopes to evaluate these qualities, to eventually determine the value of each individual jewel or gemstone. This can be done similarly in evaluations of gold and other metals.

Infrastructure 

When assessing road materials, the microscopic composition of the infrastructure is vital in determining the longevity and safety of the road, and the different requirements of varying locations. As chemical properties such as water permeability, structural stability and heat resistance affect the performance of different materials used in pavement mixes, they are taken into consideration when building for roads according to the traffic, weather, supply and budget in that area.

Medicine 
In medicine, diagnoses can be made with the assistance of microscopic observation of patient biopsies, such as cancer cells. Pathology and cytology reports include a microscopic description, which consists of analyses performed using microscopes, histochemical stains or flow cytometry. These methods can determine the structure of the diseased tissue and the severity of the disease, and early detection is possible through identification of microscopic indications of illness.

Microscopic Scale in the laboratory 
Whilst use of the microscopic scale has many roles and purposes in the scientific field, there are many biochemical patterns observed microscopically that have contributed significantly to the understanding of how human life relies on microscopic structures to function and live.

Founding experiments 
Antonie van Leeuwenhoek was not only a contributor to the invention of the microscope, he is also referred to as the “father of Microbiology”. This is due to his significant contributions in the initial observation and documentation of unicellular organisms such as bacteria and spermatozoa, and microscopic human tissue such as muscle fibres and capillaries.

Biochemistry

Human Cells 
Genetic manipulation of energy-regulating mitochondria under microscopic principles has also been found to extend organism lifespan, tackling age-associated issues in humans such as Parkinson's, Alzheimer's and multiple sclerosis. By increasing the amount of energy products made by mitochondria, the lifespan of its cell, and thus organism, increases.

DNA 
Microscopic analysis of the spatial distribution of points within DNA heterochromatin centromeres emphasise the role of the centromeric regions of chromosomes in nuclei undergoing the interphase part of cell mitosis. Such microscopic observations suggest nonrandom distribution and precise structure of centromeres during mitosis is a vital contributor to successful cell function and growth, even in cancer cells.

Chemistry and Physics 

The entropy and disorder of the universe can be observed at a microscopic scale, with reference to the second and third law of thermodynamics. In some cases, this can involve calculating the entropy change within a container of expanding gas molecules and relating it to the entropy change of its environment and the universe.

Ecology 
Ecologists  monitor the state of an ecosystem over time by identifying microscopic features within the environment. This includes the temperature and  tolerance of microorganisms such as ciliates, and their interactions with othrt Protozoa. Additionally, microscopic factors such as movement and motility can be observed in water samples of that ecosystem.

Geology 
Branches of geology involve the study of the Earth's structure at a microscopic level. Physical characteristics of rocks are recorded, and in petrography there is a specific focus on the examination of microscopic details of rocks. Similar to scanning electron microscopes, electron microprobes can be used in petrology to observe the condition that allows rocks to form, which can inform the origin of these samples. In structural geology, petrographic microscopes allow the study of rock microstructures, to determine how geologic features such as tectonic plates affect the likelihood of earthquakes and groundwater movement.

Current research

There have been both advances in microscopic technology, and discoveries in other areas of knowledge as a result of microscopic technology.

Alzheimer’s and Parkinson’s Disease 
In conjunction with fluorescent tagging, molecular details in singular amyloid proteins can be studied through new light microscopy techniques, and their relation to Alzheimer's and Parkinson's disease.

Atomic force microscopy 
Other improvements in light microscopy include the ability to view sub-wavelength, nanosized objects. Nanoscale imaging via atomic force microscopy has also been improved to allow a more precise observation of small amounts of complex objects, such as cell membranes.

Renewable energy 
Coherent microscopic patterns discovered in chemical systems support ideas of the resilience of certain substances against entropic environments. This research is being utilised to inform the productions of solar fuels, and the improvement of renewable energy.

Microscopic instrument - Micronium 
A microscopic instrument called the Micronium has also been developed through micromechanics, consisting of springs the thickness of human hair being plucked by microscopic comb drives. This is a very minimal movement that produces an audible noise to the human ear, which was not previously done by past attempts with microscopic instruments.

See also
 Macroscopic scale
 Microorganism
 Van Leeuwenhoek's microscopes
 Van Leeuwenhoek's microscopic discovery of microbial life (microorganisms)

References

Concepts in physics
Orders of magnitude